The Patani United Liberation Organisation (abbreviated PULO) is a separatist insurgent group in Thailand, calling for an independent Patani. It was founded in 1968 in Saudi Arabia.

The PULO, along with others, is currently fighting for the independence of Thailand's predominantly Malay Muslim south.

PULO's platform is highlighted by its Islamic nationalist goals, calling the Thai presence in Pattani "a colonisation" and an "illegal occupation." Its stated aims are to secede from Thailand through military and political means, and to create a state named Patani Darul Makrif (Pattani, Land of Good deeds). The PULO flag has four red and white stripes and a blue rectangle on the upper left with a crescent and a star similar to other Malaysian Malay states

History
PULO was founded in 1968 reportedly around the leadership of Kabir Abdul Rahman (Bira Kotanila), a Patani Malay scholar, who served as its chairman until his death in 2008. By late 1992, the organisation had split into three factions. The first faction was headed by Dr. Arong Muleng while the second one was led by Haji Hadi Bin Ghazali. The first faction set up the PULO Leadership Council with a symbol of a dagger crossing with a sword as its logo. The name of its armed unit is called "Kasdan Army." The second faction, also headed by Haji Sama-ae Thanam, has set up the PULO Army Command Council to give support to Kabir Abdul Rahman, the founder of PULO. A third faction that is working according to the original charter of PULO has the largest ground support and is the only group with the diplomatic credibility, political influence and popular support to be able to officially negotiate and represent PULO at the OIC. They use four stars on their flag and is led by Abu Yasir Fikri a long time respected leader of PULO since its inception.

In 1995, rifts emerged among the core leaders of the new PULO movement. As a result, Dr. Arong Muleng decided to split his group from the movement to set up a new organisation called "PULO 88", while the other group led by Haji Abdul Rahman named its armed unit as "Pulo Keris" (Dagger Pulo).

Current separatist actions
Currently, PULO has a policy of targeting those it views as collaborators and associates of the Thai government, such as teachers, civil servants, soldiers and policemen.

The organisation carries out car bombs, road side bombs and drive-by shootings targeting Thai military and police, whom they see as legitimate targets, but also has struck at civilian targets as well.

PULO considers itself to be continuing the independence struggle of the northernmost Malay sultanate after it declared its independence following the fall of Ayutthaya in 1767, though in fact it was reconquered by the Thais just 18 years later. The Islamic state proposed by PULO would cover the areas they claim were historically ruled by the Sultanate of Pattani, which it says consist of Pattani, Narathiwat, Yala, Songkhla and Satun provinces in present-day Thailand.

Four star PULO

Four star PULO claims be the most respected and popular separatist group in Patani with the most political influence and a large presence in the area, although little is known about the group as they prefer to stay out of media and work under a policy of silence. During recent years the group has become increasingly visible and been able to show their influence by gathering active separatists and organising them under their political wing, as well as being recognised internationally as representatives of the Patani People.

They are currently the political representatives by popular consent of GMIP and active military fractions of BRN, RKK and other separatist groups. The "four star" is becoming increasingly powerful steadily gaining support and loyalty from separatist from different groups forcing different fractions to join their ranks.

On 26 July 2009, the president of PULO and the Emir of the Movement of Mujahidin Islam Patani (GMIP), Cikgume Kuteh, made an official agreement to join forces. The agreement included giving a mandate to president of PULO to speak on behalf of the GMIP on all political issues. The agreement also included a section in which the movements agreed to unite in one military force, the Patani Liberation Army, to be led by the First Deputy Military Commander of the Patani United Liberation Organisation (PULO).

Four star PULO
1. In the case of Patani it seems impossible to resolving the issue if it is left entirely in the hands of the Patani people and the Thai Government. This is why international intervention in the form of external governments or the United Nations is necessary. There are some with the opinion that external presence would be interfering with the internal affairs of Thailand but we believe that since Patani is under colonial occupation and its people are struggling to regain their right of self-determination this would not be the case. Therefore, external intervention should not be seen as interfering with the internal affairs of Thailand.

2. In the first stage the government of Thailand should award the Patani area (The regions which includes Pattani, Narathiwat, Jala, Setun and five districts in the province of Sonkla) special status. The Government and Parliament should allow greater freedom for Patani to manage its internal affairs. This move would not be in contradiction with the Thai constitution and would be applicable in the case of Patani since the conditions and terms of the regions (i.e. Bangkok and Pataya) that’s already been awarded special status has been different in each case.

3. Recognition of the ethnic Malay in the same way that Thailand acknowledges ethnic Chinese in Thailand. Right now Thailand does not recognise the Malay ethnicity, which makes it difficult to prove the sincere intention of the Thai government for peaceful coexistence with the Patani people.

It is necessary that the Malay language is also recognised as the official language in the region and also that the Jawi scripture (using Arabic letters) may be used.

Thailand is trying to implement teaching in the Malay language in one school in each state but with the Thai alphabet. There is no contradiction in the policy of education in Thailand to allow the use of Jawi scripture as foreign language education in Thailand allows for English and French to be taught using the Latin alphabet, while the Japanese and Chinese languages are taught using their own letters. None of the above-mentioned languages (except Jawi) is taught using the Thai script.

4. Recognition of Islamic law in the Islamic Malay Patani, especially in the field of civil law since the majority of the people are Muslim.

5. The people in the Patani region should have a referendum in the future under international supervision to determine their own destiny, whether they want to remain part of Thailand or achieve independence from Thailand.

6. Thailand wishes to reduce the role of the Patani United Liberation Organisation (PULO) and Revolutionary National Front (BRN) while at the same time giving credit to the RKK (small and mobile combat units). However, the RKK is not an organisation, but small groups moving in the villages which are part of other liberation organisations in Patani.

Five Star PULO

The Five star PULO is differentiated from Four star PULO on the basis of their flag, which contains five stars. This fraction is mostly represented in the media by Kasturi.  The group is supported and economically backed and created by the Thai government to gain control over separatist movements and pacify them.  The Thai government has used the groups to create legitimacy around its initiated projects such as TASKFORCE.  They are a newly established group formed 2005 and is mostly known by their frequent presence in Thai media often confused with four star PULO as they share the same name. They have however been backed by the centre for humanitarian dialogue - Switzerland based NGO as well as the thai military which has kept it active.

References

External links
 
 All news about Patani (Malay, English and Thai)
 PULO analysis
 PULO and terrorism

Rebel groups in Thailand
South Thailand insurgency
Organizations established in 1968
1968 establishments in Thailand